Féroce, also referred to as féroce d'avocat (English: "fierce avocado"), is prepared using mashed avocados, cassava, olive oil and lime juice, with salt cod, garlic, chili peppers, hot sauce and seasonings blended in. It is a spicy dish that can also be used as a spread on various foods. Other seafood such as crab can be used to prepare féroce, and it is a popular dish in Martinique, an insular region of France.

See also

 List of avocado dishes
 List of spreads
 Martinique § Cuisine

References

External links
 Féroce d'avocat. Elle. 

Avocado dishes
Martinican culture